The seventh season of the Fairy Tail anime series is directed by Shinji Ishihira and produced by A-1 Pictures and Bridge. Like the rest of the series, it follows the adventures of Natsu Dragneel and Lucy Heartfilia of the fictional guild Fairy Tail. The season contains three story arcs. The first 27 episodes continue the  arc, which adapts material from the beginning of the 36th to the middle of the 40th volume of the Fairy Tail manga by Hiro Mashima. Focusing on Natsu and the others who have been frozen in time for seven years on Sirius Island, the members continue to participate in the Grand Magic Games, an annual competition to decide the Kingdom of Fiore's strongest guild. However, they encounter a conspiracy involving a time machine called Eclipse and the imminent destruction of the kingdom. The next 24 episodes form an original storyline called , in which the twelve celestial spirits of the Zodiac rebel against their owners Lucy and Yukino after being transformed by Eclipse's black magic. The remaining 39 episodes contain the  arc, which adapts material from the rest of the manga's 40th volume to the middle of the 49th volume, depicting Fairy Tail's battle with a dark guild of Zeref's demons who aim to resurrect E.N.D., their master and Zeref's ultimate creation.

The season ran from April 5, 2014, to December 26, 2015, on TV Tokyo. The first DVD compilation was released with the first issue of Fairy Tail Monthly magazine on July 17, 2014, renumbered as "Vol. 1". The season is simulcast by North American licensor Funimation Entertainment, subtitled in English on their website, and by Crunchyroll.

Fourteen pieces of theme music were used for this season: seven opening and seven ending themes. For episodes 176 to 188, the opening theme is titled "Masayume Chasing" and performed by BoA. For episodes 189 to 203, the second opening theme is "Strike Back" performed by Back-On. For episodes 204 to 214, the third opening theme is "Mysterious Magic" performed by Do as Infinity. The fourth opening, used from episodes 215 to 226, is "Break Out" performed by V6. The sixth opening theme is "Never-End Tale" performed by Tatsuyuki Kobayashi and Konomi Suzuki for episodes 240 to 252. For the rest of the season, the seventh opening theme is "Believe in Myself" performed by Edge of Life. The ending themes, used with their respective openings, are  performed by Breathe,  performed by May J,  performed by ROOT FIVE, "Don't Let Me Down" performed by Nishiuchi, "Never Ever" by Tokyo Girls' Style, "Forever Here" performed by Yoko Ishida, and  performed by Megumi Mori.



Episode list

Notes

References

General

Specific

External links
Official anime website

7
2014 Japanese television seasons
2015 Japanese television seasons